The News-Press & Gazette Company (NPG) is a media company based in St. Joseph, Missouri, wholly owned and operated by the Bradley family. It is presided by Brian Bradley and David R. Bradley, with Hank Bradley (retired), Eric Bradley and Kit Bradley serving on its board of directors. All are descendants of family patriarch Henry D. Bradley and his son, David Bradley, Sr.

News-Press & Gazette's properties include daily and weekly newspapers in Missouri and Kansas, 15 radio and television stations in California, Idaho, Oregon, Colorado, Missouri and Texas. The NPG group generally concentrates on the Kansas City and St. Joseph areas for their newspapers, and the western United States for their broadcasting properties.

History

The company traces it roots back to the St. Joseph Gazette which began publishing in 1845.  The paper chronicled much of travel into the Old West along the Oregon Trail and California Trail. It was the only newspaper that was sent west on the first ride of the Pony Express. The Gazette eventually merged with the News-Press by publisher Charles M. Palmer. When Palmer died in 1949, Henry D. Bradley was co-publisher of both papers starting in 1939 and bought them outright in 1951.

The Gazette ceased publication in 1988 when its sister, the afternoon News-Press, transitioned into a morning newspaper; however, the family kept the "Gazette" and "G" in the company name. The Bradley family expanded the focus by forming local cable television operator St. Joseph Cablevision in 1965. News-Press & Gazette expanded into broadcast television with the 1976 with purchase of WSAV-TV in Savannah, Georgia.  They would later acquire KAAL-TV in Austin, Minnesota in 1980; WJTV in Jackson, Mississippi in 1983; KSFY in Sioux Falls, South Dakota, in 1985 (and selling off KAAL-TV in the same year); WECT in Wilmington, North Carolina; signing on WJTV satellite station WHLT, Hattiesburg, Mississippi in 1987; and acquiring KOLD-TV Tucson, Arizona in 1989.  In 1993 NPG would sell off their first group of stations to other companies, but would rebuild its TV portfolio starting with KVIA-TV in El Paso, Texas.  This expansion continued into the 2000s with the launch of a 24-hour cable-only news channel for St. Joseph, News-Press NOW, along with News-Press & Gazette's acquisition of several full-power and low-power television stations; including KESQ-TV Palm Springs, California (and radio stations KESQ (AM) and KUNA-FM); KIFI-TV Idaho Falls, Idaho; KRDO-TV Colorado Springs, Colorado (and radio stations KRDO (AM) and KRDO-FM); KTVZ in Bend, Oregon; KECY-TV in El Centro, California; KEYT-TV Santa Barbara, California; and KION-TV Monterey - Salinas, California.

In 2011, the Bradley family sold the cable division, which by that time expanded its service area to parts of California and Arizona under the name NPG Cable, to Suddenlink Communications. On March 19, 2012, News-Press & Gazette announced it would establish a low-power television station in St. Joseph that would serve as the company's television flagship and the first broadcast station that the company built and signed on; it would be an affiliate of the Fox Broadcasting Company (with subchannel-only affiliations with The CW and Telemundo). The station was created using the K26LV-D station license (which it acquired, along with K16KF-D, from Sunrise, Florida-based DTV America 1, LLC on March 14 of that year); it launched on June 2, 2012, as KNPN-LD.  On July 25, 2012, NPG announced an agreement to purchase ABC affiliate KMIZ and Fox affiliate, KQFX-LD from JW Broadcasting. The deal was consummated on November 1.

Major assets

Print publications

St. Joseph, Missouri area
 St. Joseph News-Press (St. Joseph, Missouri; flagship newspaper)
 Green Acres (St. Joseph, Missouri)
 Save NOW (St. Joseph, Missouri)

Northeast Kansas
 Atchison Daily Globe (Atchison, Kansas)
 Hiawatha World (Hiawatha, Kansas)
 Miami County Republic (Paola, Kansas)

Greater Kansas City metropolitan area
 The Daily Star-Journal (Warrensburg, Missouri)
 Gladstone Dispatch (Gladstone, Missouri)
 Courier-Tribune (Smithville, Missouri)
 Read It Free (Osawatomie, Kansas)

Television stations
Television stations owned and/or operated by News-Press & Gazette Company are a mix of full-power and low-power stations, most of which carry main channel affiliations with the Big Four television networks (ABC, CBS, NBC and Fox). Its stations also carry affiliations with MyNetworkTV, The CW (with the company's CW outlets receiving their programming from The CW Plus programming service) and Spanish-language network Telemundo, via subchannel-only affiliations or affiliations with separately licensed low-power stations that are rebroadcast as subchannels on its full-power stations in the respective markets.

Stations are arranged alphabetically by state and by city of license.

Notes:
 (**) – Indicates that it was built and signed on by NPG.

Other notes:
 1 Owned by Imagicomm Communications, NPG operates KYMA via a resource sharing agreement.
 2 Owned by VistaWest Media, LLC, NPG operates these stations via a shared services agreement.
 3 This channel was sold to Suddenlink Communications as part of its purchase of NPG's cable division but was reacquired by NPG in May 2012. It was originally operated as a cable-only channel prior to June 2, 2012.
 4 Owned by Hubbard Broadcasting, NPG operates K22NM-D.

Radio stations

Other Notes:
 1 NPG took over management of the Local Marketing Agreement (LMA) of KSKX/KRDO-FM from Pikes Peak Broadcasting Company in 2006.

Former assets

Print publication 
Former publications

Television

Notes:
 1 Owned by Northwest Broadcasting (and later Cox Media Group), NPG operated KYMA via a resource sharing agreement. In 2020, CMG surrendered the license of KYMA, and moved its NBC programming to a subchannel to KSWT (which would subsequently change its callsign to KYMA). 
 2 KJCT used virtual channel 8 (and operated on analog channel 8 prior to 2009) and KKHD-LP operated on analog channel 20 under NPG ownership.

Radio

Cable operations
NPG owned cable systems under the name NPG Cable, Inc.. On November 29, 2010, NPG announced that it had agreed to sell all of its cable systems to Suddenlink Communications for $350 million; the acquisition was closed on April 1, 2011. NPG Cable systems operated in the following communities: 
 St. Joseph, Missouri
 Lake Havasu City, Arizona
 Parker, Arizona
 Blythe, California
 Bullhead City, Arizona
 Kingman, Arizona
 Flagstaff, Arizona
 Payson, Arizona
 Sedona, Arizona
 Mammoth Lakes, California
 June Lake, California
 Pine, Arizona
 Strawberry, Arizona

References

External links
 News-Press & Gazette Company-Official Site
 St. Joseph News-Press
 NPG Printing

 
St. Joseph, Missouri
Companies based in Missouri
Economy of the Western United States
Radio broadcasting companies of the United States
Television broadcasting companies of the United States
Newspaper companies of the United States
Companies established in 1845
1845 establishments in Missouri